Whitestone is an unincorporated community and census-designated place in Southeast Fairbanks Census Area, Alaska, United States. Its population was 71 as of the 2020 census. This is not to be confused with Whitestone Logging Camp CDP in the Alaskan panhandle.

Geography

Demographics

Whitestone first appeared on the 2010 U.S. Census as a census-designated place (CDP).

References

Unincorporated communities in Southeast Fairbanks Census Area, Alaska
Unincorporated communities in Alaska
Census-designated places in Southeast Fairbanks Census Area, Alaska
Census-designated places in Alaska